Fine and Mellow is an album by Ella Fitzgerald, recorded in early 1974 but not released until 1979. The album won the Grammy Award for Best Jazz Vocal Album in 1980, Fitzgerald's second win in four years.

The album is subtitled Ella Fitzgerald Jams and represents a return to the informal jam sessions at the Jazz at the Philharmonic Concerts concerts in the 1940s and 1950s. A review in Audio magazine called it "Ella's best album in years."

Track listing
 "Fine and Mellow" (Billie Holiday) – 6:05
 "I'm Just a Lucky So-and-So" (Mack David, Duke Ellington) – 6:35
 "I Don't Stand a Ghost of a Chance with You" (Bing Crosby, Ned Washington, Victor Young) – 5:01
 "Rockin' in Rhythm" (Harry Carney, Ellington, Irving Mills) – 6:00
 "I'm in the Mood for Love" (Dorothy Fields, Jimmy McHugh) – 3:15
 "'Round Midnight" (Bernie Hanighen, Thelonious Monk, Cootie Williams) – 4:37
 "I Can't Give You Anything But Love" (Fields, McHugh) – 4:10
 "The Man I Love" (George Gershwin, Ira Gershwin) – 6:45
 "Polka Dots and Moonbeams" (Johnny Burke, Jimmy Van Heusen) – 5:03

Personnel
Recorded January 8, 1974, in Hollywood, Los Angeles:

 Ella Fitzgerald - vocals
 Harry Edison - trumpet
 Clark Terry - trumpet, flugelhorn
 Zoot Sims - tenor saxophone
 Eddie 'Lockjaw' Davis
 Joe Pass - guitar
 Tommy Flanagan - piano
 Ray Brown - double bass
 Louie Bellson - drums

References

1974 albums
Ella Fitzgerald albums
Pablo Records albums
Albums produced by Norman Granz
Grammy Award for Best Jazz Vocal Album